The Directorate-General of Personnel Administration of the Executive Yuan (DGPA) of the Republic of China (Taiwan) is a government body responsible for the overall personnel administration of all ministries and agencies under the Executive Yuan.

History
The agency was established on 16 September 1967 as the Central Personnel Administration in a ceremony presided by Premier Yen Chia-kan. It adopts its current name on 6 February 2012.

Organizational structure
 Department of Planning
 Department of Organization and Manpower
 Department of Training and Employment
 Department of Remuneration and Welfare
 Department of Information Management
 Secretariat
 Personnel Office
 Accounting Office
 Civil Service Ethics Office

Agencies

 Civil Service Development Institute
 Regional Civil Service Development Institute

Ministers
Political parties:

Transportation
The building is accessible within walking distance South West from Shandao Temple Station of the Taipei Metro.

References

1967 establishments in Taiwan
Executive Yuan
Government agencies established in 1967